The Last Judgement or Scene of Intercession is part of a 1510-1420 carved limewood altarpiece produced at Biberach. It is attributed to the Biberach Master or his studio and is now in the Museum of Fine Arts of Lyon.

Sources
http://www.culture.gouv.fr/public/mistral/joconde_fr?ACTION=CHERCHER&FIELD_1=REF&VALUE_1=000SC025052

Christian sculptures
Wooden sculptures
Sculptures of the Museum of Fine Arts of Lyon
16th-century sculptures
Altarpieces
Statues of Jesus
Statues of the Virgin Mary